Robam Moni Mekhala (Khmer: របាំមណីមេខលា, Moni Mekhala Dance) sometimes known as Robam Moni Mekhala and Ream Eyso (Khmer: របាំមណីមេខលា និង រាមឥសូរ) is a traditional Cambodian dance. It is a rain dance that explores the Cambodian myth of thunder, lightning, and rain associated with Hindu and Buddhist mythology. Most of the time, this dance depicts the fight between Reamesor and Moni Mekhala where Reamesor (Ramasura/ Parashurama) or Ream Eyso attempts to seize the magical crystal ball from Moni Mekhala and this fighting creates a storm.

Overview 
An early record of dance (Khmer: robam/ rabam) is from the 7th century, where the performance was used as a funeral rite for kings. During the Angkor period, dance was ritually performed at temples. The story of Moni Mekhala and Reamesor appears frequently in ritual and Cambodian classical dance. This dance is commonly performed at the New Year's buong suong (propitiation) ritual, marking the beginning of the spring planting cycle.

Story 
The dance narrates the Cambodian myth of rain, thunder, and lightning, which is created from the fight between the strong ugly demon male, Ream Eyso (wearing a long-sleeved shirt), and the beautiful female goddess, Moni Mekhala (wearing a short-sleeved shirt), for the control of the magical crystal ball owned by Moni Mekhala.

According to Cambodian legend, a princely manifestation of the earth, Vorachhun, a goddess of the seas, Moni Mekhala, and Ream Eyso (the storm demon) all studied with the hermit known as Lok Ta Moni Eisei. A wise and powerful hermit possessed a magical crystal ball and must decide to which pupil the crystal ball should be given. He proposed a challenge: the students were told to collect a glass of morning dew and the first to present one would be the winner.

The following day, the three attempted to collect the morning dew. Among them, Moni Mekhala had the smartest method, spreading her handkerchief on the grass overnight which by morning was damp. She squeezed the dew into the glass and presented it to the hermit. As a reward for her ingenuity, Moni Mekhala was given a glittering crystal ball, while Ream Esor received a magic diamond axe and Vorachhun a magic dagger.

Jealous of Moni Mekhala, Ream Esor is determined to seize it at any cost. He plans to seize the crystal ball from Moni Mekhala. En-route to Moni Mekhala, Ream Esor met Voracchun and kills him. Then, he found Moni Mekhala, but she reacted with compassion instead of fear and evades Ream Esor. He kept attacking the goddess. However, Moni Mekhala bounces back and giving fights to defend herself. Ream Esor throws his axe at Moni Mekhala, producing thunder but not on targets because Moni Mekhala manages to dodge. When the demon tries to grab the crystal ball, Moni Mekhala sent the crystal ball flying into the sky, producing flashes of lightning that temporarily blind Ream Esor. The goddess escapes into the sky. The friction produces nourishing rain, and the fight continues as the cycle of rain on the earth.

Characters and costumes 
The main characters of the dance are Moni Mekhala and Reamesor. In most of the performance, these two characters plays the main role in the dance. In some performances, especially the royal buong suong, Moni Mekhala is performed with many pairs of devatas characters.

The costume wears by characters in Robam Moni Mekhala is similar to that of other traditional dances of the Royal Ballet of Cambodia.

Moni Mekhala 

The sampot is wrapped around the lower body then pleated into a band in the front and secured with a gold or brass belt. The  is very decorative and embroidered extensively with tiny beads and sequins. Similar to the  worn by other female characters in the Royal Ballet of Cambodia, the  worn by Moni Mekhala is designed with a diamond-shaped floral pattern thought different pattern sometimes used. Ksae sangvar, a decorated band of beads is worn crosswise. Around the neck, an embroidered collar called a 'srang kar is worn. Jewelry for this role includes a large, filigree square pendant of which is hung by the corner, various types of ankle and wrists bracelets and bangles, an armlet or a kind of golden ornament worn by gripped around both ends sleeves of the short-sleeved shirt, and body chains of various styles. 

What distinguished Moni Mekhala from other female characters in Royal Ballet of Cambodia is that she wore the short-sleeved av lakoan (blue silk shirt) and holds a sacred magical crystal ball called .

Ream Eyso 
Reamesor character wears a similar costume to the other  (giant) characters in the Royal Ballet of Cambodia and Khol, however there are distinction in mask and weapon.

Like other 's costume, Reamesor's costumes require pieces, like sleeves, to be sewn together while being put on. The 'sampot' is worn in the 'chang kben' fashion, where the front is pleated and pulled under, between the legs, then tucked in the back and the remaining length of the pleat is stitched to the 'sampot' itself to form a draping 'fan' in the back. Knee-length pants are worn underneath, displaying a wide, embroidered hem around the knees.

Ream Eyso wears a long-sleeved shirts with rich embroidering along with a collar (srang kor) around the neck. On the end of the  shoulders are a sort of epaulette that arches upwards like Indra's bow (known as ). Other components of Ream Eyso's costumes are three richly embroidered banners worn around the front waist. The center piece is known as a '' while the two side pieces are known as a '' with another piece in the back called a ''.

The character also wear an X-like strap around the body called a ''; it may be made of gold-colored silk or chains of gold with square ornaments. This characters also wear the same ankle and wrist jewelry as females, but with the addition of an extra set of bangles on the wrist and no armlets. A kite-shaped ornament called a '' (named after the bo tree leaf), which serves as a center point for their '' is worn.

The distinction between Ream Eyso and other  (giant) character is that he possesses a magic ax and wears a decorative yaksha mask with a hamsa's tail crown.

Music and song 
The music used for most Khmer classical dance is the pinpeat, this music is also used to accompany the performance of Robam Moni Mekhala. This type of orchestra consists of several types of xylophones, drums, oboes, gongs, and other musical instruments.

Similar to other dances of Royal Ballet of Cambodia, the chorus for Robam Moni Mekhala is also consists of several singers who mainly sing in the absence of music. The lyrics are in poetry form and are sung interspersed with the grammatical particles eu [əː], eung [əːŋ], and euy [əːj] in various patterns.

Performance 
In propitiation ceremonies (បួងសួង, 'buong suong'''), Robam Moni Mekhala along other dance pieces of the Royal Ballet of Cambodia was also performed at the Silver Pagoda and Throne Hall of the Royal Palace in 1960s. Nowadays, venues for performances by the Royal Ballet include the Royal University of Fine Art, the Chenla Theatre and the Chaktomuk Conference Hall.

Recently Robam Moni Mekhala was also performed in many occasions such as in the buong suong rituals in 2008 and 2019 in the Royal Palace and at the annual Bon Phum Festival. Robam Moni Mekhala along with other dance pieces were performed abroad as well.

 Role 
Robam Moni Mekhala has been enacted for centuries and perform at least once a year in a sacred ceremony known as "boung suong" accompanied by Cambodian sacred music.'' During the rituals, dancers became a messengers between king and gods asking for rain, fertility, and the blessing for Cambodia and the well-being for the people.

Moral 
Researchers believe that this dance is centered on the independent woman who used her intelligence to resist Ream Esor, a male character. The dance also expresses the strength and fast reaction as the most demanding female role in Khmer classical dance.

Cultural interpretation with nature 

Cambodians see this legend as the origin of thunder, lightning, and rain. The fight between Moni Mekhala and Reamesor believed to re-occur every year in mid-April around the time of Cambodian New Year. This period is at the height of the dry season just before the monsoon rains will fall and nourish the Cambodian farmland. The monsoon rains symbolizes a renewed life when the dried fields are flooded and fertilized. The dark clouds reminds the locals about the eternal battle between Reamesor and Moni Mekhala and this represent the eternal raining cycle in Cambodia.

See also 
 Manimhekala
 Cambodian Classical Dance
 Robam Sovann Machha

References 

Cambodian dances